Indigenous Nigerian music is the music originating from the various indigenous tribes of Nigeria. It encompasses mainly traditional music styles, although some forms have absorbed partial influences from genres performed by immigrant and foreign musicians.

Instruments

Traditional forms
Hausa music
Igbo music (Odumodu, Ogene)
Yoruba music (Apala, Fuji, Juju)

Contemporary music
These genres have incorporated external musical influences:

Afrobeat 
Afro-juju
Igbo Highlife
Igbo rap
Waka
Yo-pop

See also
Music of Nigeria
African popular music

References

 
Indigenous music